Deal railway station serves Deal in Kent, England. The station and all trains serving it are operated by Southeastern.

History

Early Years

Deal was originally the terminus of a South Eastern Railway branch line from Minster Junction through Sandwich and opened on 1 July 1847. This meant the original services to London ran via Canterbury, Ashford, Tonbridge, Redhill and Croydon to London Bridge. Charles Dickens attended the celebrations that accompanied the opening of the line. The link south to Dover was delayed by commercial rivalry between the two Kent railway companies, the South Eastern Railway and the London, Chatham & Dover Railway. However, the companies finally agreed to build the line jointly and it opened on 15 June 1881.

The original single platform with its 2-storey 1847 building became the new 'up' platform. This line now continued south under a new flyover carrying London Road and necessitated demolition of the middle houses in Sunnyside Terrace. The siding next to this was extended to become a through siding. Finally, a new 'down' platform was built to the west with buildings similar to those at Walmer. The existence of this middle siding explains the gap between the current tracks. The footbridge, which originally had a roof, also dates to 1881.

Hence the milepost on the 'up' platform at Deal says 90¾ (via Canterbury) but Deal is actually only 86¾ miles from Charing Cross (via Dover).

Deal used to have extensive coal yards (bordered by St Patrick's Road), goods yards (now Sainsbury's) and a locomotive shed and turntable (now Bridgeside). The locomotive shed was shut in 1930. Albert Terrace was built in the 1860s for railway employees in a line with Lower Queen Street before the railway was extended to Dover. Hence the London Road flyover was built with a 'kink' around them. The station-master's house received a direct hit during World War 2 (although a garden wall still exists), as did the goods shed. The substantial buildings on the 'down' platform were demolished about 1970  and replaced with small CLASP-style buildings. These have since been replaced with a small modern shelter, as shown in the photograph on the right.

Signalling

Deal retains its semaphore signals at the station and at Victoria Park.

The signal box moved from the platform to the Western Road level crossing in 1939. It is a good example of a Southern Railway odeon/art deco ‘glasshouse’ signal box (a Type 13). One siding remains, occasionally used for infrastructure trains.

Former services
During the 19th and early 20th centuries Deal enjoyed a higher status than now as a resort and, with extensive Royal Marine barracks, was a terminating/originating point for a number of trains travelling routes that seem unusual nowadays. Trains to/from London could run either north or south. For example, there were direct trains to Reading via Redhill, and a daily service to Birkenhead began in 1903 and continued for many years, surviving as a daily through train to Wolverhampton until 1962. There was also a daily train to Manchester before WW1 and regular daily trains to Victoria until the 1960s. From 1948 to 1962, the peak 16:56 service from Cannon Street that divided at Ashford was unusual in having both portions call at Deal. The portion via Dover called at Deal at 19:16, to Ramsgate. The portion via Canterbury called 3 minutes later, to Dover.

Electrification
Services through Deal were electrified using the 3rd rail system at 750 volts DC as Phase 2 of British Rail's Kent Coast Electrification Scheme. Some electric trains began running in 1961, with the full service beginning with the Summer timetable on 18 June 1962. There were 2 trains per hour (tph) off-peak, mostly from Charing Cross to Ramsgate, until May 1982, when the service was reduced to 1 tph off-peak (2 tph in the peaks).

Services
All services at Deal are operated by Southeastern using  and  EMUs.

The typical off-peak service in trains per hour is:
 1 tph to London St Pancras International
 1 tph to 

During the peak hours, the station is also served by a number of services between Ramsgate and London Charing Cross via .

TV
Deal and its station featured in an episode of the BBC TV Great British Railway Journeys, Series 2, that aired on BBC2 on 27 January 2011. Presenter Michael Portillo travelled from Ramsgate to Folkestone and spent the night at Deal's historic Royal Hotel. He explored local attractions including Walmer Castle and the Timeball Tower.

Current facilities and access
Deal station has a ticket office, waiting room and café.
The station building also incorporates toilets (including disabled access and baby-changing facilities), staff facilities, photo machine and snack machines. There is a help-point and automatic ticket machine on the platform.

References

External links

Deal, Kent
Railway stations in Kent
DfT Category E stations
Former South Eastern Railway (UK) stations
Railway stations in Great Britain opened in 1847
Railway stations served by Southeastern
1847 establishments in England